The attorney general of South Dakota is the state attorney general of the U.S. state of South Dakota. The attorney general is elected by popular vote to a four-year term and holds an executive position as the state's chief legal officer. In 1992, the voters approved a constitutional amendment to limit all constitutional officers and the governor to two consecutive four-year terms.

Structure of the office
The South Dakota Attorney General's Office represents and provides legal advice to agencies, boards, and commissions of the government of South Dakota. The office represents the state in state and federal court, as well as in administrative adjudication and rulemaking hearings. The office handles felony criminal appeals, advises local prosecutors in the conduct of criminal trials and handles cases at the request of local prosecutors. In addition, the office issues formal opinions interpreting statutes for the agencies and political subdivisions of the state.

History 
Within South Dakota, the office of attorney general is often considered a stepping stone to the office of governor. Six attorneys general, Coe I. Crawford (won 1904 and 1906), Merrell Q. Sharpe (won 1942 and 1944; lost 1946), George Theodore Mickelson (won 1946 and 1948), Sigurd Anderson (won 1950 and 1952; lost 1964), Frank Farrar (won 1968; lost 1970) and Bill Janklow (won 1978, 1982, 1994 and 1998), have each been elected governor. Meanwhile, six others, Robert Dollard (lost 1892), Mark Barnett (lost 2002), Buell Jones (lost 1928), Leo Temmey (lost 1942), Phil Saunders (lost 1958), and Marty Jackley (lost 2018), have run for governor unsuccessfully. Attorneys general and former attorneys general have a record of 13 wins and 9 losses in running for governor. A graduate of the University of South Dakota School of Law had held the office of attorney general from 1959 until 2022. South Dakota has the second longest streak of Republican attorneys general in the country, dating back to 1975 (Nebraska has had Republican attorneys general since 1951). <ref></</ref>

List of attorneys general
Parties

Elections

The voters of the U.S. State of South Dakota elect an attorney general for a four-year term. The winning candidate is shown in bold.

See also
United States Attorney for the District of South Dakota
South Dakota Supreme Court
University of South Dakota School of Law
Attorney General of Minnesota

References

External links
 South Dakota Attorney General official website
 South Dakota Attorney General articles at ABA Journal
 News and Commentary at FindLaw
 South Dakota Codified Laws at Law.Justia.com
 U.S. Supreme Court Opinions - "Cases with title containing: State of South Dakota" at FindLaw
 State Bar of South Dakota
 South Dakota Attorney General Marty J. Jackley profile at National Association of Attorneys General
 Press releases at South Dakota Attorney General